Sarzay is a commune in the Indre department in central France.

History
First mentioned in written records in 1300, Sarzay was a parish of the Archbishop of Bourges. The seigneurie of Sarzay belonged to the Barbançois family, who constructed the castle of Sarzay, and they remained the possessor of the fief until 1720.  The fief was transformed into a marquisat in 1651.  The castle was the setting for a novel by George Sand, le Meunier d'Angibault.

Population

See also
Communes of the Indre department

References

Communes of Indre